Cinithians were an ancient Berber tribe of Roman North Africa, who occupied the area of modern Algeria.

Several inscriptions bear testimony of their presence. From near the Roman town of Githis, in southern Tunisia, there is a second-century dedication to The Empire and Memmius Pacatus, who 'stood out among his people'. Here he is called a 'Cinithius'. It is believed that he was a leader of the tribe and his family went on to achieve senatorial rank.

At the veteran colony of Sitifis there is another  inscription that mentions the tribe of the Cinithians.

They are also cited by Cornelius Tacitus as "...a nation by no means contemptible".

References

Berber peoples and tribes
Ancient Algeria
Berber history
Countries in ancient Africa